Laroumada was a town in the borderlands of ancient Isauria and Cilicia, inhabited in Roman times. The name does not occur among ancient authors but is inferred from epigraphic and other evidence.

Its site is located near Esenler, Asiatic Turkey.

References

Populated places in ancient Cilicia
Populated places in ancient Isauria
Former populated places in Turkey
Roman towns and cities in Turkey
History of Konya Province